Formed in 2010, the Schenectady Legends were a semi-professional basketball team in the Independent Basketball Association (IBA). The franchise was originally known as the Albany Legends, changing their name in 2014 with a move to Schenectady. They folded in 2017 with the end of Independent Basketball Association.

As a result of experiences gained while playing with the Legends, more than 80% of alumni and current players, including former NBAers have been promoted to top professional leagues on five continents, including: the NBA D-League (Kyle Cuffe, Springfield Armor 2010), Japan, Denmark, Saudi Arabia, Tunisia, Thailand, Canada, England, Italy, Chile, France and Germany.

Some local capital region players playing abroad include Lloyd Johnson (Lucera, Italy), EJ Gallup (TBB Trier), Evan Lane (Tunisia, Africa), Will Harris (Denmark) and Scotty McRae (Chile and Italy) and Prince Jackson (Italy).

History
The team was established in April 2010 by an independent and locally owned organization, a year after the demise of the Albany Patroons. The team were part of the International Basketball League. The Legends finished off their inaugural season 19-3 and went on to win the IBL 2010 championship.

Albany finished with a 15–7 record in 2011, losing in the IBL semifinals to the Edmonton Energy.

After two seasons in the IBL, the Legends joined the Independent Basketball Association. Albany finished 12–5 in the 2012 spring season, coming up short in the IBA championship game.

In March 2014 the team announced they would be moving to Schenectady County and compete in the 2014-15 IBA Fall season. The Schenectady Legends played their home games in multiple venues throughout the Mohawk Valley, as a means to increase their local brand and recognition, while raising money for local charities. The team finished a perfect 11–0 in the IBA regular season.

On September 4, 2014, the club announced the hiring of former Siena College player Scott Knapp as its head coach.

On December 14, 2014, the Legends completed a perfect 13–0 season by defeating the Kenosha Ballers 154–137 in the IBA championship game. Legends player Lloyd Johnson was named the IBA Finals MVP after scoring 61 points in the championship game.

Current roster

Head Coach: Scott Knapp

Notable former players

Kenny Satterfield

Rashaun Freeman

Season results

Coaches

References

External links
 Legends website
 Schenectady Legends on USbasket

Basketball teams in New York (state)
Sports in Albany, New York
2010 establishments in New York (state)
Basketball teams established in 2010
Schenectady, New York
Sports in Schenectady County, New York